The Immortal Losing Game is a chess game between the Soviet grandmaster David Bronstein and the Polish International Master  Bogdan Śliwa played in 1957 in Gotha.  The name is an allusion to the more famous Immortal Game between Adolf Anderssen and Lionel Kieseritzky. The game acquired its name because Bronstein, in a completely lost position, set a series of elegant traps in an attempt to swindle a victory from a lost game, although Śliwa deftly avoided the traps and won.

The game
White: Bogdan Śliwa  Black: David Bronstein  Opening: ECO A81

1. d4 f5 2. g3 g6 3. Bg2 Bg7 4. Nc3 Nf6 
Both players have fianchettoed their bishops. If White had played the now-standard 4.c4 instead of 4.Nc3, the Leningrad Variation of the Dutch Defence would have been reached.

5. Bg5 Nc6 6. Qd2 d6 7. h4 e6 8. 0-0-0 h6 9. Bf4 Bd7 10. e4 fxe4 11. Nxe4 Nd5 12. Ne2 Qe7 13. c4 Nb6 
Better is 13...Nxf4 14.Nxf4 Qf7.

14. c5 dxc5 15. Bxc7! 0-0? 16. Bd6 
White wins the exchange by skewering Black's queen and rook.

16... Qf7 17. Bxf8 Rxf8 18. dxc5 Nd5 19. f4 Rd8 20. N2c3 Ndb4? 21. Nd6 Qf8 22. Nxb7 Nd4! 
If 22...Rb8 then 23.Qxd7.

23. Nxd8 Bb5! (diagram) 24. Nxe6! 
If 24.Nxb5 then 24...Qf5! and now:
 25.Nxd4 Nxa2 
 25.Qxb4?? Qc2# 
 25.Nc3?? Nxa2+! 26.Nxa2 Nb3# 
 25.Rde1?? Nxa2+ 26.Kd1 Qb1+ 27.Qc1 Qxc1# 
 25.b3 Qxc5+ 26.Kb1! (26.Nc3?? Ne2+! 27.Qxe2 Qxc3+ 28.Kb1 Qa1#) Qf5+ 27.Kc1! Qc5+ draws by perpetual check 
 White can still probably win with 25.Qf2! Nxa2+ 26.Kd2 Nxb5 27.Ke1
  
24... Bd3! 25. Bd5! 
If 25.Nxf8?? then 25...Nxa2+ 26.Nxa2 Nb3#.

25... Qf5! 26. Nxd4+ Qxd5! (diagram) 27. Nc2! 
If 27.Nxd5?? then 27...Nxa2#.

27... Bxc3 28. bxc3! 
If 28.Qxc3?? then 28...Nxa2+ wins the queen.

28... Qxa2 29. cxb4!  
If 29.Nxb4?? then 29...Qb1#.

See also 
 List of chess games

References

 Analysis

External links
The game on Chessgames.com

Chess games
Chess in Germany
1957 in chess
1957 in Germany
Nicknamed sporting events